Abbasabad (also Romanized as ‘Abbāsābād; also known as Qal‘eh Cham) is a village in Kamfiruz-e Jonubi Rural District, Kamfiruz District, Marvdasht County, Fars Province, Iran. At the 2006 census, its population was 1,252, in 208 families.

References 

Populated places in Marvdasht County